Efetobor Wesley Apochi (born 2 November 1987 in Orogun, Delta State, Nigeria) is the captain of the Nigerian boxing team and has represented Nigeria in several international tournaments as a heavyweight.

Efetobor Apochi entered international boxing competition at the 2011 All-Africa Games, where he surprised the boxing world by taking second.  Apochi then represented Nigeria at the 2013 World Championships, winning his first match before falling to the eventual gold medalist, Teymur Mammadov.  In January 2014, Apochi joined the Mexico Guerreros of the World Series of Boxing.

At the 2014 Commonwealth Games, Efetobor Apochi captained the Nigerian boxing team.  He knocked out his initial opponent in the first round and then upset Australia's Jai Opetaia in the quarterfinals.  In the semi-finals, Apochi lost to the eventual gold medalist, Samir El Mais.  As a result, Apochi received a bronze medal.

Apochi studied microbiology at the Federal University of Technology Owerri.

Professional boxing record

See also
 Boxing at the 2014 Commonwealth Games – Heavyweight
 2013 AIBA World Boxing Championships – Heavyweight
 2012 African Boxing Olympic Qualification Tournament#Heavyweight
 Boxing at the 2011 All-Africa Games

References

External links
 
 Photo: Australia's Jai Opetaia fights Nigeria's Efetobor Apochi
 Photo: Efetobor Apochi of Nigeria competes against Samir El-Mais of Canada

1987 births
Living people
Heavyweight boxers
Commonwealth Games bronze medallists for Nigeria
Boxers at the 2014 Commonwealth Games
Sportspeople from Delta State
Federal University of Technology Owerri alumni
Nigerian male boxers
Commonwealth Games medallists in boxing
African Games silver medalists for Nigeria
African Games medalists in boxing
Competitors at the 2011 All-Africa Games
Competitors at the 2015 African Games
Medallists at the 2014 Commonwealth Games